Hollabrunn is a district capital town in the Austrian state of Lower Austria, on the Göllersbach river. It is situated in the heart of the biggest wine region of Austria, the Weinviertel.

History 
The surroundings of Hollabrunn were first settled in neolithic times. Around 300 B.C. one of the most significant La Tène culture cities in central Europe briefly flourished on the southern slopes of the Sandberg hill at Roseldorf close to the village of Platt, a few kilometers to the northwest of Hollabrunn.

On November 16, 1805, the nearby town of Schöngrabern was the site of a battle between the French Napoleonic troops under Joachim Murat (including general Nicolas Charles Oudinot, who was wounded) and the Russian general Pyotr Bagration (who was protecting Kutuzov's retreat north).

People 

 Philipp Fleischmann, born here (de)
 Hans Hermann Groër, lived here
 Felix von Luschan, born here
 Karl Anton Nowotny, born here
 Markus Suttner, born here
 Felix von Winiwarter, lived here
Dr. Berta M. (Drechsel) Weber, born here

Sources and references 

 Nouveau Larousse illustré, undated, early 20th century, in French

Cities and towns in Hollabrunn District
La Tène culture